Cyclone Harvey was a tropical cyclone that struck Queensland and the Northern Territory of Australia during the 2004–05 Australian region cyclone season. It had a minimum pressure of 

Meteorological history

A series of weak low pressure systems in the Gulf of Carpentaria and Timor Sea prompted the Bureau of Meteorology to go on Low Key Standby on 3 February 2005. While there was a moderate risk of tropical cyclone development, there were several weak lows, not a main well-defined low, and this led to High Key Standby being delayed until 4 February.  On 5 February, the Brisbane Tropical Cyclone Warning Center (TCWC) issued an advice for municipalities along the southern side of the Gulf of Carpentaria as the Watch Phase was entered. On 6 February, Warning Phase commenced as Harvey strengthened to a Category 1 storm, and by 7 February, the cyclone had reached Category 3. The system then made landfall along the coast of the southern side of the gulf later that day.

Preparations and impact
Warnings were issued along the coast between Mornington Island in Queensland and Port McArthur, Borroloola and Robinson River in the Northern Territory. Municipalities were warned to expect flooding and high tides.

At Robinson River, flooding led to "severe road damage," which was estimated to be $1 million AUD ($750,000 USD in 2005). Downed trees and minor building damage was also reported.

Aftermath
The Bureau of Meteorology retired the name Harvey after its usage.

See also

2004–05 Australian region cyclone season

References

External links

2004–05 Australian region cyclone season
2005 in Australia
Retired Australian region cyclones
Category 3 Australian region cyclones
Harvey